Escalante Petrified Forest State Park (also known as Escalante State Park) is a state park of Utah, USA, located a half-mile (0.8 km) north of the town of Escalante.  A visitor center was built in 1991, and features displays of plant and marine fossils, petrified wood and fossilized dinosaur bones over 150 million years old (Upper Jurassic Period). The Petrified Forest Trail is a one-mile (1.6 km) loop, winding up the side of a mesa to the top where most of the fossil wood occurs. Logs two feet or more in diameter are seen at several places along the trail where it is eroding from the conglomerate capping the mesa. This conglomerate lies near the top of the Brushy Basin Member of the Morrison Formation. The wood is multicolored (mostly red, yellow, white, and black) and was prized by hobbyists before the Park was established. The logs are believed to be of conifers that were transported by a river before being buried and later fossilized as agate. A 50 foot (15m) log is displayed near the trail head and is one of the most complete fossil logs known from the Morrison Formation.

The Sleeping Rainbows trail is an optional  loop off the Petrified Forest Trail. This section is much steeper and requires scrambling and climbing over rocks.

In 1954 Wide Hollow Reservoir was constructed to provide irrigation for the town of Escalante. The reservoir is stocked with rainbow trout and bluegill, and is popular for water sports including swimming, boating and fishing.

References

External links

Escalante Petrified Forest State Park

Protected areas of Garfield County, Utah
Protected areas established in 1963
State parks of Utah
Petrified forests
Fossil parks in the United States
Paleontology in Utah
Paleontological protected areas in the United States